Boldero may refer to

Boldero Bank
Edmund Boldero (1608–79), English Royalist clergyman
Henry George Boldero (1794–1873), British army officer and Member of Parliament
Luigi Gorgio Boldero (Baldero) (19th century), Italian painter
Ancient English spelling of Bolderāja, Latvia